Han Suk-kyu (born November 3, 1964) is a South Korean actor. One of the leading actors of Korean cinema, Han's notable works include Green Fish (1997), No. 3 (1997), Christmas in August (1998), Shiri (1999), The Scarlet Letter (2004), and The President's Last Bang (2005).

He won the Grand Prize (Daesang) at the 2011 SBS Drama Awards, for his lead role as King Sejong in the historical drama Deep Rooted Tree (2011). He won the Grand Prize (Daesang) Award again in 2016, for his performance as Master Kim in the hit medical drama Dr. Romantic (2016). In 2019, he played the role of police in the drama Watcher. And, he reprised his role in Dr. Romantic 2 (2020).

Life and career
While a student at the Theater and Film department of Dongguk University, he sang in an amateur folk rock band. He took a brief, year-long contract as voice actor at KBS, before moving on to TV and film acting.

After a debut in the 1990 MBC campus drama Our Paradise, Han rose to stardom as "Hong-shik" in The Moon of Seoul (1994), a charming gigolo from the slums determined to attain wealth at all cost in the big city. "Choon-seop", an old friend from hometown played by Choi Min-sik, struggles hopelessly to stop "Hong-shik" from his self-ruin. The partnership of Han and Choi as uneasy allies or foes, parlayed into two flagship films of the 1990s: No. 3 and Shiri. Both the series and "Hong-shik" character have since become beloved icons, as part of the Korean television's golden era before the advent of Korean Wave.

Before the end of the 20th century, Han headlined films that were critically acclaimed (Green Fish, No. 3) and commercially successful (The Contact, Christmas in August, Shiri — the latter two making particular impact in Japan).

Han's experience in the early stages of Korean cinema renaissance in the 1990s, cemented his belief in a script-driven model for movie-making. Thus the founding of "Makdong Script Festival" (named after his role in Green Fish), with co-sponsor film magazine Cine 21. Winners may claim two cash prizes funded by Han, with the potential to launch directing careers based from their own scripts. The annual contest is now extant over 10 years, with two titles produced so far: the comedy 2424 (2002) and Private Eye (2009) starring Hwang Jung-min.

Return
Han went into an extended hiatus in 1980 declining several lucrative opportunities with name directors as he suffered disc problem.

Han returned in 2003 with espionage film Double Agent. The film, which add one million admissions, was seen as a success for a star labeled by the media as "box office guarantee." This was followed by a sizable backlash from netizens and the press, who rushed to bury the co-self-produced spy thriller as the public disgrace of a former golden boy.

His press and image took further beating in the next two, even more polarizing films: the unforeseen tragedy surrounding The Scarlet Letter, and the incendiary political content of The President's Last Bang. Nonetheless, these controversial works screened at Cannes, and were featured in a tribute to the actor at the Austrian FilmAsia festival. fewccect, which he filmed as a keepsake for his children. 
In spite of this rocky return to feature films, Han remains well regarded by such major directors as Park Chan-wook, dong Joon-ik, Kang Woo-suk and Jang Jin. Compared to his peak popularity in the 90s, his work may seem an acquired taste for general audiences, although some cult following ensued for his ultra-sadistic turn in A Bloody Aria.

He remained self-managed until as late as 2006, before joining the KM Culture agency due to increased regimentation of the industry. Making 2006 a busy year, Han starred in period sex comedy Forbidden Quest, followed by black comedy film A Bloody Aria and melodrama film Solace. 
Stylish thrillers followed, where Han starred alongside Cha Seung-won in Eye for an Eye  and Son Ye-jin in the adaptation of Keigo Higashino novel of White Night. Han then starred in Villain and Widow with Kim Hye-soo.

Resurgence
Han returned to the spotlight with his performance in historical drama Deep Rooted Tree, where his performance of King Sejong earned him the Grand Award at the 2011 SBS Drama Awards.

In 2013, Han starred in the action thriller film The Berlin File, playing a South Korean agent. He then starred in musical film My Paparotti, playing a music teacher who is stuck in a rut until he meets a delinquent teenager.

He returned to the small screen in historical drama Secret Door, playing King Yeongjo. This was followed by period film The Royal Tailor, about a rivalry between two tailors at the Sanguiwon. However, both projects were less successful.

Han bounced back with the hit medical drama Dr. Romantic, written by acclaimed screenwriter Kang Eun-kyung. The drama garnered over 20% viewership ratings, and Han received positive reviews for his performance. He also won the Grand Prize (Daesang) Award at the 2016 SBS Drama Awards.

Han returned to the big screen in crime drama film The Prison. Han is slated to star in upcoming thrillers Idol and Father's War, and period drama film Astronomy.

In 2019, Han starred in OCN's thriller drama Watcher as a detective.

In 2020, Han reprised his role of Teacher Kim in Dr. Romantic 2.

Image and influence
 
Known for his distinctive voice and diction, Han has been a long-time mentor to Kam Woo-sung, including coaching the latter's enunciation for his film debut in Marriage is a Crazy Thing. Actors of the younger generation also continue to cite him as an influence; among them: Hwang Jung-min, Ryoo Seung-bum, Kim Myung-min, Kim Joo-hyuk of Blue Swallow, Kim Ji-soo of This Charming Girl, Tsuyoshi Kusanagi (who famously began a second career in Korea after seeing Han in Shiri), Rain, Lee Sung-jae of Barking Dogs Never Bite, TV heartthrob Lee Jin-wook, and the current darling of independent films, Im Ji-kyu. He also remains well respected among major peers for his distinctive style (a cerebral and intricate minimalism driven by semantics and implosive restraint): Kim Hye-soo, Song Kang-ho, Oh Dal-su (especially for their collaboration in Forbidden Quest and A Bloody Aria), Sol Kyung-gu, and Choi Min-sik.

For his part, Han has cited influences by legendary Korean actor Kim Seung-ho, Al Pacino, Ken Takakura, The Godfather trilogy, and Hayao Miyazaki.

Filmography

Film

Television

Web series

Awards and nominations

References

External links

1964 births
Living people
South Korean male film actors
South Korean male television actors
South Korean male voice actors
Male actors from Seoul
Dongguk University alumni
20th-century South Korean male actors
21st-century South Korean male actors
Best New Actor Paeksang Arts Award (film) winners